An ancestral shrine, hall or temple ( or , ; Chữ Hán: 家祠户), also called lineage temple, is a temple dedicated to deified ancestors and progenitors of surname lineages or families in the Chinese tradition. Ancestral temples are closely linked to Confucian philosophy and culture and the emphasis that it places on filial piety.

A common central feature of the ancestral temples are the ancestral tablets that embody the ancestral spirits. The ancestral tablets are typically arranged by seniority of the ancestors. Altars and other ritual objects such as incense burners are also common fixtures. Ancestors and gods can also be represented by statues.

The temples are used for collective rituals and festivals in honor of the ancestors but also for other family- and community-related functions such as weddings and funerals. Sometimes, they serve wider community functions such as meetings and local elections.

In traditional weddings, the ancestral temple serves a major symbolic function, completing the transfer of a woman to her husband's family. During the wedding rites, the bride and groom worship at the groom's ancestral shrine, bowing as follows:
first bow - Heaven and Earth
second bow - ancestors
third bow - parents
fourth bow - spouse

Three months after the marriage, the wife undertakes worship at the husband's ancestral shrine, in a rite known as miaojian (廟見).

In mainland China, ancestral temples along with other temples have often been destroyed or forced to become "secularized" as village schools or granaries during the land reform of the 1950s and the Cultural Revolution. They have experienced a revival since the economic liberalization of the 1980s. The revival of the ancestral temples has been particularly strong in southern China where lineage organization had stronger roots in the local culture and local communities are more likely to have clan members living overseas who are keen to support the revival and rebuilding of the shrines through donations.

Etymology
 has its first character Ci Shrine in

 has its first character derived from Jongmyo, and its second character is Ci Shrine

That phrasing can be seen as making the Jongmyo a more sacralized version, since Ci shrines are considered lower ranked than Miao shrines.

Gallery

Taiwan
Notable ancestral temples in Taiwan include:
 Koxinga Ancestral Shrine, in West Central District, Tainan
 Liu Clan Shrine, in Liouying District, Tainan
 Yang Family Ancestral Hall, in Jiadong Township, Pingtung County
 Wukou Village Liou Family Ancestral Hall, in Wanluan Township, Pingtung County
 Zhong-Sheng-Gong Memorial, in Pingtung City, Pingtung County
 Shetou Doushan Temple, in Shetou Township, Changhua County
 Chen Dexing Ancestral Hall, in Datong District, Taipei

Hong Kong
Notable ancestral temples in Hong Kong include:
 Tang Ancestral Hall and Yu Kiu Ancestral Hall, along the Ping Shan Heritage Trail
 King Law Ka Shuk
 Tang Chung Ling Ancestral Hall

Southeast Asia
Notable ancestral temples in Chinese communities of Southeast Asia include:
 Long Shan Tang Temple, in Yangon, Myanmar
 Khoo Kongsi, in Penang, Malaysia
 Eng Chuan Tong Tan Kongsi, in Penang, Malaysia
 Tan Si Chong Su, in Singapore

Vietnam
 
Ancestral temple is called nhà thờ họ, nhà thờ tộc or từ đường in Vietnam. An ancestral death anniversary will be held yearly at nhà thờ họ and this anniversary is usually used as an occasion to renew the relationship between clan members.

In other religions and cultures 
Ancestral shrines or similar concepts are also common in other religions and cultures. Especially other East and Southeast Asian but also traditional African religions have ancestral shrines and or tombs. Ancestor worship is an important and common element in native African religions and is still common and practiced by followers of folk religions but also Christian and Muslim Africans.

See also
 Chinese folk religion
 Confucianism
 Chinese ancestral worship
 Ancestor tablets
 Chinese lineage associations
 Ancestral home
 Chinese kin
 Zupu
 Guanxi
 Kongsi
 Bodaiji
 Jesa

References

External links

 China Ancestral Temples Network
 Ancestral halls in Tai Po, Hong Kong

 
Filial piety
Ci Shrines